Atractylis is a genus of plants in the family Asteraceae.

 Species
Atractylis is native to the greater Mediterranean region (southern Europe, the Middle East, North Africa, and the Canary Islands).

References

External links

Cynareae
Asteraceae genera